{{DISPLAYTITLE:C32H41N5O5}}
The molecular formula C32H41N5O5 (molar mass: 575.710 g/mol) may refer to:

 Ergocryptine
 beta-Ergocryptine

Molecular formulas